Cumberland is a home rule-class city in Harlan County, Kentucky, in the United States. The population according to the 2010 Census was 2,237, down from 2,611 at the 2000 census.

History
Cumberland was settled in 1837 and named "Poor Fork", for its location on a fork of the Cumberland River with relatively poor soil. It remained isolated until the coal mining boom of the 1900s when railroads connected it with surrounding towns. It was renamed "Cumberland" in 1926.

On July 29, 2019, a group of coal miners blocked a coal train on a track in protest when the company they worked for, Blackjewel LLC, refused to pay them after declaring bankruptcy. Blackjewel was founded in 2017, and it was one of the largest coal mining companies in the country. Its bankruptcy filing also affected employees in Virginia and Wyoming; in total about 1700 miners have been affected.  The miners called off the protest in late September 2019, mostly because they have found other jobs. They intend to continue their fight in court.

Geography

Cumberland is located in northeastern Harlan County at  (36.977016, -82.987434) in the valley of the Poor Fork of the Cumberland River, where it is joined by Looney Creek from the southeast and Cloverlick Creek from the south. The city limits extend to the north up to the crest of Pine Mountain, which forms the Letcher County line.

U.S. Route 119 passes through Cumberland, passing south of the city center. US 119 leads northeast  to Jenkins and southwest  to Harlan, the Harlan County seat.

Climate
The climate in this area is characterized by hot, humid summers and generally mild to cool winters. According to the Köppen Climate Classification system, Cumberland has a humid subtropical climate, abbreviated "Cfa" on climate maps.

Demographics

As of the census of 2000, there were 2,611 people, 1,076 households, and 723 families residing in the city. The racial makeup of the city was 93.60% White, 5.09% African American, 0.50% Native American, 0.04% Asian, 0.04% from other races, and 0.73% from two or more races. Hispanic or Latino of any race were 0.84% of the population.

There were 1,076 households, out of which 31.4% had children under the age of 18 living with them, 46.7% were married couples living together, 16.8% had a female householder with no husband present, and 32.8% were non-families. 31.0% of all households were made up of individuals, and 14.1% had someone living alone who was 65 years of age or older. The average household size was 2.35 and the average family size was 2.95.

In the city, the population was spread out, with 25.5% under the age of 18, 9.2% from 18 to 24, 25.5% from 25 to 44, 22.1% from 45 to 64, and 17.7% who were 65 years of age or older. The median age was 38 years. For every 100 females, there were 87.7 males. For every 100 females age 18 and over, there were 82.6 males.

The median income for a household in the city was $15,929, and the median income for a family was $22,365. Males had a median income of $34,327 versus $13,750 for females. The per capita income for the city was $9,835. About 31.5% of families and 38.7% of the population were below the poverty line, including 56.3% of those under age 18 and 19.5% of those age 65 or over.

Education
Cumberland is home to the main campus of Southeast Kentucky Community and Technical College, part of the Kentucky Community and Technical College System.

Cumberland has a lending library, a branch of the Harlan County Public Library.

Arts and culture
Cumberland is home to Kingdom Come State Park, which features a lake, gift shop, camp sites, miniature golf, paddleboating, picnic facilities, primitive camping, hiking trails, and an amphitheatre. The park is home to natural rock formations including Raven Rock and Log Rock. Two overlooks in the park provide scenic views of the Appalachian Mountains.

Cumberland is home to the annual Kingdom Come Swappin' Meetin', a festival honoring Appalachian history, folklore, and products. The festival is held on the campus of Southeast Kentucky Community and Technical College in Cumberland. The festival includes live demonstrations of Appalachian methods and traditions. The most recent festival is the annual Black Bear Festival, in honor of the popular black bears at Kingdom Come State Park.

See also 
 Cumberland Central Business District

References

Further reading
 Caudill, Harry M., Night Comes to the Cumberlands (1963). 

Cities in Harlan County, Kentucky
Cities in Kentucky
Populated places established in 1826
Mining communities in Kentucky
1826 establishments in Kentucky